"Flipside" is a song by American rapper Freeway and the third single from his debut studio album Philadelphia Freeway (2003). It features American rapper Peedi Crakk and was produced by Just Blaze.

Background
The song originated from an R&B version of "Roc the Mic" by Beanie Sigel and Freeway. Freeway made his song "Make the Cake" to the beat, while Just Blaze reworked the beat to make it sound different. The song originally featured rapper Oschino of the group State Property in the last verse, but he was removed from it. Peedi Crakk was later included on the track, in which he performs the intro and second verse. The song was renamed as "Flipside".

Critical reception
Music critic Nathan Rabin praised the song, while writing for The A.V. Club: "The rapper shares Sigel's gruff soul-of-the-gutter sensibility, but proves surprisingly adept at poppy dance-rap on 'Flipside,' which features Blaze doing his best Timbaland impression."

Music video
The music video was filmed in Philadelphia. It shows Freeway having a block party on his block, until the police shut it down. The people continue to party at Peedi Crakk's block, but the police end it again. They then start partying on the rooftops.

Charts

References

2003 songs
2003 singles
Freeway (rapper) songs
Peedi Crakk songs
Roc-A-Fella Records singles
Song recordings produced by Just Blaze
Songs written by Just Blaze